Baby Fox were a 1990s British trip hop band made up of members Christine Ann Leach, Alex Gray and Dwight Clarke. They produced two albums.

Discography
 A Normal Family (1996)
 Dum Dum Baby (1998)
Tracks:
	Dum Dum Baby
	Heaven's Gate
	The Rookery, Pt. 1
	The Rookery, Pt. 2
	Nearly Beautiful
	Zodiac
	Bad Girl Love
	Bluebird - co-writer: Tennessee Williams
	Fury to Forgiveness
	Rainy London Sunday
	Hallow'een
	Still Point
	That's the Way It Is - written by and ft. Christine Leach
	The Line's Cleared
	Naked Hour

References

Trip hop groups